Connor McCullagh (born 22 March 1961) is an Irish athlete. He competed in the men's hammer throw at the 1984 Summer Olympics and the 1988 Summer Olympics.

His son, Conor McCullough was the 2010 World Junior Champion in the hammer throw, competing for the United States.

References

1961 births
Living people
Athletes (track and field) at the 1984 Summer Olympics
Athletes (track and field) at the 1988 Summer Olympics
Irish male hammer throwers
Olympic athletes of Ireland
Place of birth missing (living people)